Culture Complex is an underground station of the Gwangju Metro Line 1 in Gwangsan-dong, Dong District, Gwangju, South Korea.

Station Layout

External links

  Cyber station information from Gwangju Metropolitan Rapid Transit Corporation
  Cyber station information from Gwangju Metropolitan Rapid Transit Corporation

Gwangju Metro stations
Dong District, Gwangju
Railway stations opened in 2004